Spink Colony is a census-designated place (CDP) and Hutterite colony in Spink County, South Dakota, United States. It was first listed as a CDP prior to the 2020 census. The population of the CDP was 135 at the 2020 Census.

It is in the southern part of the county, on the east side of the James River.

The Old Spink Colony, part of the CDP, was listed on the National Register of Historic Places in 1982.

Demographics

References 

Census-designated places in Spink County, South Dakota
Census-designated places in South Dakota
Hutterite communities in the United States